The Third Squadron is a 1926 German silent war film directed by Carl Wilhelm and starring Fritz Spira, Eugen Burg, and Reinhold Häussermann. It was shot at the EFA Studios in Berlin and on location in Vienna. The film's art direction was by Otto Erdmann and Hans Sohnle. It was based on a play by Bernhard Buchbinder.

Cast

References

Bibliography

External links

1926 films
1920s war comedy films
German war comedy films
Films of the Weimar Republic
German silent feature films
Films directed by Carl Wilhelm
German films based on plays
Military humor in film
Films set in the 1900s
Films set in Austria
German black-and-white films
Silent war comedy films
1920s German films
Films shot at Halensee Studios
Films shot in Vienna
1920s German-language films